Waiting for Touchdown is a compilation album by the New Zealand band Sneaky Feelings, released in 1986. It combines  songs from the album Send You and the singles "Husband House" and "Better than Before".

Critical reception
AllMusic called the album "a highly crafted and beautiful collection of guitar pop songs, exhibiting a sound and sensibility that would crop up much later in the U.K. indie sound of Arab Strap and Belle & Sebastian."

Track listing
Side A
Better Than Before
Waiting For Touchdown
Someone Else's Eyes
Strangers Again
Wouldn't Cry
Not To Take Sides
Side B
Throwing Stones
Major Barbara
The Strange And Conflicting Feelings Of Separation And Betrayal
Husband House
Won't Change

Personnel
Kathryn Tyrie - bass guitar
John Kelcher - vocals, bass guitar, synthesizer, piano
Martin Durrant - vocals, drums, piano, synthesizer, percussion
David Pine - vocals, guitar, bass guitar
Matthew Bannister - vocals, guitar, organ, piano, synthesizer, vibraphone, percussion 
Chris Neilson - trumpet

References

1986 compilation albums
Flying Nun Records compilation albums
Sneaky Feelings albums